Repression may refer to:
 Memory inhibition, the ability to filter irrelevant memories from attempts to recall
 Political repression, the oppression or persecution of an individual or group for political reasons
 Psychological repression, the psychological act of excluding desires and impulses from one's consciousness
 Social repression, the socially supported mistreatment and exploitation of a group of individuals
 Genetic repression, the down-regulation of gene transcription by the action of repressor proteins binding to a promoter
 "Repression" (Star Trek: Voyager), an episode of the science fiction television series Star Trek: Voyager, the fourth episode of the seventh (and final) season of the series